Thomas Francis Blenkinsop (born 14 August 1980) is a British politician who served as Member of Parliament (MP) for Middlesbrough South and East Cleveland from 2010 to 2017. A member of the Labour Party, he was an Opposition Whip under Ed Miliband's leadership from 2011 to 2015.

Early life and career
Born in Middlesbrough and brought up in Marton, Blenkinsop was educated at St. Augustine's Roman Catholic Primary School in Coulby Newham, Newlands School FCJ, and St. Mary's Sixth Form College in Saltersgill. He graduated from Teesside University with a BSc in Philosophy, Politics and Economics, and the University of Warwick with an MA in Continental philosophy.

Blenkinsop worked as a constituency researcher for Ashok Kumar, Labour MP for Middlesbrough South and East Cleveland, from 2002 to 2008. He became a campaign manager for the Community Trade Union in 2008 and continued in the role until his election to Parliament in 2010.

Parliamentary career
Blenkinsop was selected as the Labour candidate for Middlesbrough South and East Cleveland in April 2010, following Ashok Kumar's unexpected death the previous month. He was elected at the May 2010 general election, albeit with a majority significantly reduced to under 2,000.

In his first Parliamentary term, he was a member of the Environment, Food and Rural Affairs Select Committee from 2010 to 2012, the Standards and Privileges Committee from 2010 to 2011 and the Treasury Select Committee in 2011. He joined the opposition front bench under the leadership of Ed Miliband, serving as a whip from 2011 to 2015.

He was re-elected with a marginally increased majority at the 2015 general election. During his second Parliamentary term, he was a member of the Energy and Climate Change Committee from 2015 to 2016, the Privileges Committee from 2015 to 2017, the Standards Committee from 2015 to 2017, and the Northern Ireland Affairs Committee from 2016 to 2017. Blenkinsop signed up to the Army Reserve in 2017. 

Blenkinsop supported Liz Kendall in the 2015 Labour leadership election and Owen Smith in the 2016 leadership election. After he called for party leader Jeremy Corbyn's resignation in 2016, a Labour member was suspended and investigated by the police for allegedly threatening him.

He announced he would be standing down at the 2017 general election as he could not campaign for Labour whilst Corbyn served as party leader.

Post-parliamentary career 
Blenkinsop returned to the Community union as a London-based project manager after leaving Parliament, and became a public affairs advisor for the Federation of Small Business in 2020.

Personal life
Blenkinsop married Victoria Emtage in 2007.

References

External links

1980 births
Living people
UK MPs 2010–2015
UK MPs 2015–2017
Labour Party (UK) MPs for English constituencies
Alumni of Teesside University
Alumni of the University of Warwick
English Roman Catholics
People from Middlesbrough